Otoro may be,

Otoro River, Honduras
Otoro Nuba people
Otoro language